S.P.O.C.K (aka Star Pilot On Channel K) is a Swedish synthpop band which formed around 1988.

Background
The band's original lineup was songwriter Eddie Bengtsson (formerly a founding member of Page), Finn Albertsson, and vocalist Alexander Hofman. Over time the members of the band have shifted: Johan Billing was a member of the band from 1994 to 1998, but with the release of S.P.O.C.K: 1999 (in 1999) the band's lineup changed to one with Alexander Hofman (the band's only remaining founding member), Johan Malmgren (former member of Elegant Machinery and Aaron Sutcliffe) and Christer Hermodsson.

In 1988, Eddie Bengtsson wrote a handful of songs to be performed at Finn Albertsson's birthday party, with Alexander Hofman performing vocals; the three young men dubbed the band Mr. Spock (after the name for the character Spock of Star Trek). After the performance at the party, the band continued for several months to play at other house parties, but soon managed to secure some event bookings. In 1989, the band members contacted Paramount Pictures for permission to use the name "Mr. Spock". When Paramount demanded a heavy compensation for the privilege, the band renamed themselves using the initials S.P.O.C.K, which are an acronym for Star Pilot On Channel K.

S.P.O.C.K's commercial success began in 1990 when the Swedish record label Accelerating Blue Fish published "Silicon Dream" as a limited-edition 7-inch single. The lyrical subject matter of S.P.O.C.K's songs frequently centers on science fiction stories, (in particular, Star Trek). Other topics include alien-human relations and life in space. Representative songs include: "Alien Attack", "E.T. Phone Home", "Never Trust a Klingon", "Not Human", "In Space No One Can Hear You Scream", "Mr. Spock's Brain", "Dr. McCoy" and "Astrogirl".

On stage the band members adopted a cyberpunk/sci-fi-esque personae, with Eddie Bengtsson calling himself "Eddie B. Kirk", Alexander Hofman as "Android", and Finn Albertsson as "Cybernoid". Together with such bands as Page, Elegant Machinery, Sista Mannen På Jorden and Kiethevez, S.P.O.C.K helped to define the sound of the Swedish synthpop movement.

In 1997, members of S.P.O.C.K started their own recording label SubSpace Communications. The band's 1999 album, 1999, ranked #25 on the German Alternative Chart's (DAC) 1999 Top 50 Albums chart.

In 2010 Christer Hermodsson left the band in order to focus on other musical endeavors. He was then replaced by Valdi Solemo. The band's current line up is vocalist Alexander Hofman (a.k.a. Android - the only remaining founding member), keyboardist Valdi Solemo (aka Val Solo), and keyboardist Johan Malmgren (aka Yo-Haan).

During the last years S.P.O.C.K has focused more on live gigs. Mostly in Germany, but also in Sweden, Canada & Estonia.

Johan Malmgren and Eskil Simonsson of the band Covenant formed the band Aaron Sutcliffe in 1999 to perform synthpop covers of Elvis Presley songs.

Discography

Albums
 Five Year Mission – CD (1993) Energy Rekords
 Alien Worlds – CD (1995) Energy Rekords
 A Piece of the Action – 2xCD Ltd. Edition (1995) Energy Rekords
 Assignment: Earth – CD (1997) SubSpace Communications/VISION Records/TCM Musikproduktionsgesellschaft mbH • CD (1998) SubSpace Communications – #16 CMJ RPM Charts (U.S.)
 Earth Orbit: Live – CD (1997) SubSpace Communications/VISION Records
 Official Fan Club – CD (1997) no label
 S.P.O.C.K: 1999 – CD (1999) SubSpace Communications/VISION Records – #29 CMJ RPM Charts (U.S.); #25 DAC (Germany)
 2001: A S.P.O.C.K Odyssey – CD (2001) Bloodline/SubSpace Communications
 Another Piece of the Action – CD and Vinyl (limited to 500 copies) (2012) SubSpace Communications

Singles
 Silicon Dream – 7" (1990) Accelerating Blue Fish
 Never Trust a Klingon – CD Single (1992) Energy Rekords
 Strange Dimensions – CD Single (1993) Energy Rekords
 Never Trust a Klingon (2294 AD) – CD Single (1994) Energy Rekords
 Astrogirl – CD Single (1994) Energy Rekords
 All E.T:s Aren't Nice – CD Single (1995) Energy Rekords
 Alien Attack – CD Single (1997) SubSpace Communications/VISION Records
 E.T. Phone Home – CD Single (1997) SubSpace Communications/VISION Records
 Speed of Light – CD Single (1998) SubSpace Communications
 Dr. McCoy – CD Single (1998) SubSpace Communications
 Klingon 2000 – CD Single (2000) Bloodline/SubSpace Communications – #93 DAC Top Singles 2000
 Where Rockets Fly – CD Single (2000) Bloodline/SubSpace Communications
 Queen of Space – CD Single (2001) SubSpace Communications
 Satellites – CD Single (2001) Bloodline/SubSpace Communications

Videos
 Live At Virtual X-Mas 93 – VHS (1994) Energy Rekords

Compilation appearances
 I Sometimes Wish I Was Famous – A Swedish Tribute To Depeche Mode – CD track No. 10 "Ice Machine" – Depeche Mode cover (1991) Energy Rekords
 Virtual X-mas 92 – CD track No. 5 "White Christmas" (1992) Energy Rekords
 Technopolis Vol. VII – CD track No. 8 "Never Trust a Klingon (Gravity Version)" (1992) Back In Black – Unofficial Release
 To Be Stun – CD track No. 8 "E-lectric" (1993) Rayher Disc
 Moonraker – 2xCD disc No. 2 track No. 7 "Never Trust a Klingon" (1994) Sub Terranean
 Virtual Energy – Volume Two – CD track No. 6 "Beam Me Up (Transporter Mix)" (1994) Energy Rekords
 Virtual X-mas 94 – CD track No. 1f "Never Trust a Klingon", No. 1g "E-lectric" and No. 1h "Strange Dimensions" (1994) Energy Rekords
 To Cut A Long Story Short – A Tribute to the Pioneers of Electronic Pop – CD track No. 2 "Planet Earth" (1995) Energy Rekords
 Energy Rekords & Beat That! Records 1996 – CD track No. 9 "Astrogirl (Original)" and No. 10 "Trouble With Tribbles" (1996) Energy Rekords
 Popnation – Best of Blekingska Nationen 1994-1996 – CD track No. 19 "Astrogirl" (1996) Beat That!
 Electric Ballroom – 2xCD disc No. 2 track No. 5 "Stranged (Limited Version)" (1997) Sub Terranean
 Neurostyle Vol. VII – CD track No. 6 "Not Human" (1997) Sub Terranean
 Sauna – Hösten 1997 – CD track No. 6 "Not Human" (1997) Suana Magazine
 Sound-Line Vol. 6 – CD track No. 12 "E.T. Phone Home" (1997) Side-Line
 A RefleXion of Synthpop Volume 1 – CD track No. 2 "Human Decision Required (Re-Edit) " (1998) Maschinenwelt Records
 Best of Electronic Music – 2xCD Ltd. Edition disc No. 1 track No. 7 "Dr. McCoy" (1998) TCM Musikproduktionsgesellschaft mbH
 Binary Application Extension 05 – CD track No. 15 "Force of Life" (1998) Genocide Project
 Deejay Tribe – 2xCD disc No. 2 track No. 9 "Speed of Light" (1998) Credo
 We Came to Watch Part 1 – VHS "E.T. Phone Home" (1998) Credo/Nova Tekk
 EBM Club Classics – 2xCD disc No. 2 track No. 6 "Never Trust a Klingon (A Version)" (1998) Synthetic Symphony
 Pleasure & Pain Volume One – CD track No. 3 "Alien Attack" and track No. 10 "All the Children Shall Lead" (1998) TCM Musikproduktionsgesellschaft mbH
 Public Communication 1 – CD track No. 3 "Spacewalk" (1998) SubSpace Communications
 Strange Love 2 – CD track No. 13 "Speed of Light" (1998) Orkus
 Best of Electronic Music Vol. 2 – 2xCD disc No. 1 track No. 12 "Never Trust a Klingon (Mox Epoques Federation Mix)" (1999) TCM Musikproduktionsgesellschaft mbH
 Dion Fortune Sampler Vol. VI – CD track No. 17 "E.T. Phone Home" Dion Fortune
 Elegy – Numéro 4 – CD track No. 5 "E.T. Phone Home (Live)" (1999) Dion Fortune
 Wellenreiter In Schwarz Vol. 3 – 2xCD disc No. 1 track No. 13 "Dr. McCoy (Synchronisiert)" (1999) Credo/Nova Tekk
 World of Synthpop – 2xCD disc No. 2 track No. 1 "Spacewalk" (1999) Sterntaler/Zoomshot Media Entertainment
 Xtra Compilation II – 2xCD disc No. 1 track No. 6 "Spacewalk" (1999) Angelwings
 Zillo Club Hits – CD track No. 13 "Dr. McCoy (Classic Version)" (1999) Zillo
 Zillo Festival Sampler 1999 – 2xCD disc No. 2 track No. 8 "Out There" (1999) Zillo
 ZilloScope: New Signs & Sounds 04/99 – CD track No. 7 "Star Pilot On Channel K" (1999) Zillo
 Cover Classics Volume Two – CD track No. 4 "I Don't Know What It Is" – Pete Shelly cover (2000) VISION Records
 Cyberl@b V2.0 – 2xCD disc No. 1 track No. 7 "Dr. McCoy (Classic)" (2000) Matrix Cube
 Electro Club Attack – Shot Three – 2xCD disc No. 2 track No. 6 "Klingon 2000 (Danny B's Phaser House Cut)" (2000) XXC/Zoomshot Media Entertainment
 ElectroManiac Vol. 1 – CD track No. 4 "Out There" (2000) Bloodline
 Gothic Compilation Part XII – CD track No. 8 "Where Rockets Fly (Original Version)" (2000) Batbeliever Releases
 The Best of Loves – A Tribute to Depeche Mode – CD track No. 10 "Ice Machine" – Depeche Mode cover (2000) Energy Rekords
 World of Synthpop 2 – 2xCD disc No. 1 track No. 4 "Out There" (2000) Sterntaler
 Best of Electronic Music Vol. 3 – 2xCD disc No. 1 track No. 7 "Satellites (Sputnik Mix)" (2001) Bloodline
 Clubline Volume 2 – CD track No. 3 "Queen of Space (Stop Dave, I'm Going Crazy ...)" (2001) Bloodline
 Clubline Volume 3 – CD track No. 1 "Reactivated" (2001) Bloodline
 D-Side 2 – CD track No. 12 "Where Rockets Fly (Electromix)" (2001) D-Side
 Electro Club Attack – Shot Four – 2xCD disc No. 2 track No. 7 "Where Rockets Fly" (2001) XXC/Zoomshot Media Entertainment
 Euro Rock Fest VL 2001 – 2xCD disc No. 1 track No. 9 "Where Rockets Fly (Electromix)" (2001) Angelwings/Zoomshot Media Entertainment
 Ghosts from the Darkside Vol. 3 – 2xCD "Klingon 2000 (Radio Mix)" (2001) Purple Flower
 M'era Luna Festival 2001 – 2xCD disc No. 2 track No. 9 "Queen of Space (Stop Dave, I'm Going Crazy 2001)" (2001) Oblivion
 New Forms of Synthetic Pop V.2.0 – CD track No. 8 "Satellites" (2001) Bloodline
 Pleasure and Pain Volume Two – CD track#1 "I Don't Know What it Is" and track No. 9 "Star Pilot On Channel K" (2001) Bloodline
 PRGDA vs. SSC – CD track No. 1 "Astrogirl's Secret" (2001) SubSpace Communications
 Sonic Seducer Cold Hands Seduction Vol. XII – CD + VCD, video No. 9 "Take Me to the Stars" and video No. 10 "Interview" (2001) Sonic Seducer
 Strange Love 5 – CD track No. 12 "Satellites (Sputnik Mix)" (2001) Orkus
 Volume 6 – CD track No. 5 "Satellites (Single Version)" (2001) Prospective Music Magazine
 World of Synthpop 3 – 2xCD disc No. 1 track No. 5 "Reactivated" (2001) Sterntaler/Zoomshot Media Entertainment
 Zillo Club Hits 6 – CD track No. 11 "Queen of Space" (2001) Zillo
 Clubline Volume 1 – CD track No. 7 "Klingon 2000" (2002) Bloodline
 World of Synthpop 4 – 2xCD disc No. 1 track No. 4 "Babylon 5" (2002) Sterntaler/Zoomshot Media Entertainment

References

External links

S.P.O.C.K Official Fan Site
S.P.O.C.K Official Facebook page
S.P.O.C.K Official MySpace

Electro-industrial music groups
Swedish synthpop groups